CKOA-FM is a Canadian radio station, broadcasting at 89.7 FM in Glace Bay, Nova Scotia. Owned and operated by the Coastal Community Radio Cooperative, the station broadcasts a community radio format branded as The Coast 89.7.

The station was licensed by the CRTC in 2007, and went on the air on December 3 of that year.

The Coastal Community Radio Cooperative began life as a low-powered 50-watt special events station, broadcasting from various locations and temporary studios in Glace Bay and Sydney, NS.

References

External links
 The Coast 89.7 Facebook
 The Coast 89.7
 
 

KOA
KOA
Radio stations established in 2007
2007 establishments in Nova Scotia